A Gunfight is a 1971 American Western film directed by Lamont Johnson, starring Kirk Douglas and Johnny Cash.

The film was financed by the Jicarilla Apache Tribe, although there are no leading Native American characters in the story.

Douglas' fee was $150,000 plus a percentage of the profits.

Plot
Will Tenneray and Abe Cross are two aging, famous gunfighters, both in need of money.
Cross rides into town, having failed as a gold prospector. His reputation is such that everyone expects him to shoot it out with Tenneray, who capitalizes on his legend by working at the saloon to "sucker fools into buying drinks." To the town's surprise, Tenneray and Cross take a liking to one another. There is no hostility between them whatsoever.

Tenneray is desperate for money, however. He comes up with the idea to stage a duel to the death in a bullfight arena, with the ticket proceeds going to the winner. Unfortunately, by killing Cross, he reasons to Nora, his wife, "I could lose my best friend." The actual gunfight is shot in a low-key and unromanticised fashion, and is over in a couple of seconds, Cross killing Tenneray with the first bullet. (This defies conventions with the "man in black" winning.)

There is an extended fantasy sequence near the end, where we see what might have happened if Tenneray had won, which may have confused some viewers. It may be open to interpretation if this is Cross's fantasy or Tenneray's widow's fantasy.

Cast
 Kirk Douglas as Will Tenneray
 Johnny Cash as Abe Cross
 Jane Alexander as Nora Tenneray
 Karen Black as Jenny Sims
 Keith Carradine as Young Gunfighter
 Dana Elcar as Marv
 Raf Vallone as Francisco Alvarez
 Eric Douglas as Bud Tenneray
 Robert J. Wilke as  Marshal Tom Cater
 Paul Lambert as  Ed Fleury

Production
The film was based on an original script by Harold Bloom who sent it to Kirk Douglas who loved it and decided to star and co-produce. Douglas persuaded Johnny Cash to co star. Finance came in part from the oil-rich Jicarilla tribe, whose head, Chief Charlie, was an admirer of Johnny Cash. Filming took place in New Mexico.

See also
 List of American films of 1971

References

External links
 
 

1971 Western (genre) films
American Western (genre) films
Bryna Productions films
Films directed by Lamont Johnson
Films scored by Laurence Rosenthal
Paramount Pictures films
Films shot in Madrid
Jicarilla Apache
1970s English-language films
1970s American films